The 1980–81 season was the North American Soccer League's second indoor soccer season.

Overview
A total of 19 of a possible 21 NASL teams participated. New York and Montreal (who was moving from Philadelphia) were the only hold-outs this indoor season. Just as the season was getting underway, the Jacksonville Tea Men relocated from New England. Teams played an 18-game regular season. The four Canadian teams were realigned into one division and forced to play only one another during the regular season. This was due to early season litigation which restricted NASL teams' travel between the U.S. and Canada. The Edmonton Drillers won the championship in a two-game finals-sweep of the Chicago Sting. This was the Drillers' first, and only, NASL indoor title. Kai Haaskivi of Edmonton won both the regular season and playoff MVP awards.

Regular season
W = Wins, L = Losses, GB = Games Behind 1st Place, % = Winning Percentage, GF = Goals For, GA = Goals Against

NASL All-Stars
All-star selections were made, by region, by the NASL coaches and general managers. Each voter cast ballots for one goalie and five outfield players regardless of position.

Playoffs

Bracket

1st round
If a playoff series is tied after two games, a 15 minute, tie breaker mini-game is played.
#Scheduling conflicts at the Portland Coliseum forced both games to be played in Chicago.

Semi-finals

Championship finals
*Scheduling conflicts at the Northlands Coliseum forced Game 1 of the Finals to be moved across the street to the Edmonton Gardens.

Championship match reports

1980–81 NASL Indoor Champions: Edmonton Drillers

Post season awards
Most Valuable Player: Kai Haaskivi, Edmonton
Finals MVP: Kai Haaskivi, Edmonton

References

NASL Indoor Season, 1980-81
NASL Indoor Season, 1980-81
1981 in Canadian sports
NASL Indoor seasons